Thompson v. Oklahoma, 487 U.S. 815 (1988), was the first case since the moratorium on capital punishment was lifted in the United States in which the U.S. Supreme Court overturned the death sentence of a minor on grounds of "cruel and unusual punishment." The holding in Thompson was expanded on by Roper v. Simmons (2005), where the Supreme Court extended the "evolving standards" rationale to those under 18 years old.

Background
William Wayne Thompson was a 15-year-old repeat offender from Grady County, Oklahoma. His sister, Vicki, was married to Charles Keene, who was accused of beating Vicki and William. William and three other men (Tony Mann, Richard Jones, and Bobby Glass) then kidnapped Charles on the night of January 23, 1983, in Amber, Oklahoma. Charles attempted to escape, running to neighbor John "Possum" Brown's door. He reportedly knocked on the door and screamed, "Possum, open the door, they're going to kill me". Brown opened the door, only to see four men dragging Keene from the door and beating him. When Brown called the police, the assailants grabbed Keene and fled.

Keene's body was found later in the nearby river, his body split throat to the abdomen. He had multiple bruises and two gunshot wounds, along with a concrete block tied to his legs. William was arrested after Vicki confessed to the police that William said that "he had taken care of him." The three other assailants were convicted of murder and sentenced to death; Richard Jones later had his sentence repealed. Bobby Glass was murdered in prison. After Thompson was arrested he underwent psychiatric evaluation to determine whether he was eligible to stand trial as an adult. He was found responsible for his deeds and convicted by the District Court of Grady County in Chickasha, Oklahoma. He was sentenced to death by the jury.

Appeals
Thompson's attorneys first attempted to appeal the case on the basis of inflammatory photographs used by the prosecution to allegedly provoke the jury. Although the Oklahoma Court of Criminal Appeals found that two of the photographs should have been excluded from the trial, the overwhelming evidence meant that the case was affirmed by the appellate court.

Due to Thompson's rapidly approaching execution, his attorneys subsequently filed his case with the Supreme Court, saying that the execution of a juvenile was unconstitutional under the Eighth Amendment's "Cruel and Unusual Punishment" clause.

Opinion of the Court
The Court voted 5-3 in favor of Thompson (Justice Kennedy did not participate), holding that Thompson's execution would violate the Eighth Amendment to the United States Constitution as applied to the states through the Fourteenth Amendment. A plurality opinion by Justice Stevens noted the "evolving standards of decency that mark the progress of a maturing society" as a primary rationale for the decision - an opinion that was strongly rejected in Justice Scalia's  dissent. The plurality also noted that numerous U.S. jurisdictions and all industrialized Western nations had banned the execution of minors under 16 years of age.

Aftermath
Thompson was later resentenced to life in prison with the possibility of parole. As of 2015, William Wayne Thompson and Tony Mann are still incarcerated. Thompson was granted parole in 2003, but that was later overturned by Oklahoma governor Brad Henry. His sister Vicki is currently campaigning to parole her brother.

See also
Capital punishment for juveniles in the United States
Stanford v. Kentucky (1989) – held that capital punishment was permissible for those aged 16 or 17 at the time of the offence
Roper v. Simmons (2005) – held that capital punishment is unconstitutional where offender was aged under 18 at the time of the offence
Atkins v. Virginia (2002) – held that capital punishment is unconstitutional for those with intellectual disabilities
 List of United States Supreme Court cases, volume 487
 List of United States Supreme Court cases
 Lists of United States Supreme Court cases by volume
 List of United States Supreme Court cases by the Rehnquist Court

References

External links

United States Supreme Court cases
Cruel and Unusual Punishment Clause and death penalty case law
Capital punishment in Oklahoma
Legal history of Oklahoma
1988 in United States case law
Capital punishment for juveniles
Grady County, Oklahoma
United States Supreme Court cases of the Rehnquist Court